Thomas or Tom Dodd may refer to:

 Thomas J. Dodd (1907–1971), United States Senator and Representative from Connecticut
 Thomas J. Dodd Jr. (born 1935), former United States Ambassador to Uruguay and to Costa Rica
 Thomas Dodd (printseller) (1771–1850), English auctioneer and printseller
 Thomas Dodd (artist) (born 1961), visual artist and photographer from Atlanta, Georgia
 Tom Dodd (baseball) (born 1958), American baseball player
 Tom Dodd (rugby union) (born 1997), Scottish rugby union player
 Tom Dodd (actor) (1883–1963), Manx dialect performer